was a shōnen manga magazine which was published monthly in Japan by Shueisha from 1970 to 2007 under the Jump line of magazines. It was the sister magazine to Weekly Shōnen Jump.

History 

The Monthly Shōnen Jump magazine started as a spin-off issue of Weekly Jump called Bessatsu Shōnen Jump.

The second spin-off issue was called Monthly Shōnen Jump, which caught on and became its own separate independent manga magazine.

Shōnen manga magazines in Japan in the 1980s focused on bishōjo characters, and Monthly Shōnen Jump stood out due to the many product and toy tie-ins it had during that period and into the 1990s. An off-shoot, Hobby's Jump, was published for 16 issues from 1983 to 1988. Another spin-off Go!Go! Jump was a collaboration between its sister magazine Weekly Jump and Monthly Jump; it was published in 2005 and was only published once.

On 22 February 2007, Shueisha announced that Monthly Jump would cease publication as of the July issue (on sale June 6, 2007.) Sales had slumped to a third of the magazine's peak, though a new magazine called Jump SQ. took its place on 2 November.

In a letter dated 2 May 2007, Shueisha announced that Claymore takes a month break but it, Gag Manga Biyori, Rosario + Vampire, and Tegami Bachi continued in Weekly Shōnen Jump until the start of the magazine Jump SQ.

List of titles 
Titles with ☆ were transferred to Shueisha's Jump Square. The magazine's longest running manga were: Kattobi itto (Motoki Monma), Wataru Ga Pyun! (Tsuyoshi Nakaima) and Eleven (Taro Nami, Hiroshi Takahashi)

Last series 
Rosario + Vampire
Claymore☆
Tegami Bachi☆
Sheisen no Shachi
Gag Manga Biyori
Passacaglia Op.7
Étoile
Blue Dragon ST
Buttobi Itto
Kurohime
Mr. Perfect
DohRan
Surebrec -Nora the 2nd-
Kuroi Love Letter
Mizu Cinema

Past series 
Kia Asamiya
Steam Detectives (Moved to Ultra Jump at the magazines start.)
Kazunari Kakei
Nora: The Last Chronicle of Devildom
Koji Kousaka
Sutobasu Yarō Shō
Yūichi Agarie & Kenichi Sakura
Kotokuri ★
Dragon Drive
Hiroshi Aro
Sherriff
Futaba-kun Change!
Rin Hirai
Legendz
Akira Toriyama
Neko Majin Z
Hiroyuki Asada
I'll
Takehiko Inoue
Buzzer Beater
Akio Chiba
Captain
Kōichi Endo
Shinigami-kun
Fumihito Higashitani
Kuroi Love Letter ★
Daisuke Higuchi
Go Ahead
Shotaro Ishinomori
Cyborg 009
Yūko Ishizuka
Anoa no Mori ★
Bibiko Kurowa
Gentō Club
Gatarō Man
Jigoku Kōshien
Kōsuke Masuda
Gag Manga Biyori ★☆
Takayuki Mizushina
Uwa no Sora Chūihō
Akira Momozato
Guts Ranpei
Motoki Monma
Kattobi Itto
Go Nagai
Kekko Kamen
Maboroshi Panty (written by Yasutaka Nagai)
Keiji Nakazawa
I Saw It (published in America by EduComics)
Tarō Nami & Hiroshi Takahashi
Eleven
Riku Sanjo & Koji Inada
Beet the Vandel Buster ★ (Moved to Jump Square Crown)
Ami Shibata
Ayakashi Tenma
Yoshihiro Takahashi
Shiroi Senshi Yamato
Kikuhide Tani & Yoshihiro Kuroiwa
Zenki
Osamu Tezuka
Astro Boy
1985 e no Tabidachi
Godfather no Musuko
Grotesque e no Shōtai
Inai Inai Bā
Norihiro Yagi
Angel Densetsu
Claymore ★☆
Katakura Masanori
Kurohime★☆

Circulation

References

External links
 Monthly Jump Web 

1970 establishments in Japan
2007 disestablishments in Japan
Defunct magazines published in Japan
Magazines established in 1970
Magazines disestablished in 2007
Magazines published in Tokyo
Monthly manga magazines published in Japan
Shueisha magazines